A two-player game is a multiplayer game that is played by precisely two players. This is distinct from a solitaire game, which is played by only one player.

Examples 
The following are some examples of two-player games. This list is not intended to be exhaustive.
 Board games:
 Chess
 Draughts
 Go
 Some wargames, such as Hammer of the Scots
 Card games:
 Cribbage
 Whist
 Rummy
 66
 Pinochle
 Magic: The Gathering, a collectible card game in which players duel
 Sports:
 Cue sports, a family of games that use cue sticks and billiard balls
 Many athletic games, such as tennis (singles)
 Video games:
Pong
A Way Out

See also 
 List of types of games
 Zero-sum game

References 

Game terminology
Game theory game classes